The 2010 Individual Speedway Polish Championship was the 2010 version of Individual Speedway Polish Championship organized by the Polish Motor Union (PZM). The Championship was won by Janusz Kołodziej, who beat Krzysztof Kasprzak in the Run-off. Third was Rafał Dobrucki. Kołodziej, who won 2009 (host in 2010), 2010 Golden Helmet and 2010 Speedway World Cup was award nomination to the 2011 Speedway Grand Prix. The defending Champion, Tomasz Gollob, who was a 2010 Speedway Grand Prix leader, resigned from the IMP Final.

Format 
In four quarter-finals was started 64 riders and to semi-finals was qualify 27 riders (top 6 from Lublin' QR and top 7 from Opole, Piła and Poznań meetings. This 27 riders and 5 seeded was started in two semi-finals. This five riders was Grand Prix permanent riders (Tomasz Gollob, Rune Holta and Jarosław Hampel) and top 3 from 2009 Polish Championship Final (Gollob, Krzysztof Kasprzak and Janusz Kołodziej). The top 8 riders from both SF was qualify for the final in Zielona Góra. The hosting of the final is traditionally awarded to the defending Team Polish Champion, Falubaz Zielona Góra.

Quarter-finals

Semi-finals

The final 
 7 August 2010 18 September 2010
  Zielona Góra
Referee:
References
Change:
 Draw 5. Tomasz Gollob, GOR → 18. Dobrucki
 Draw 18. Rafał Dobrucki, ZIE  → Zengota

Key

References 

2010
Individual